The Tomić Psalter (Tomichov psaltir) is a 14th-century Bulgarian illuminated psalter. Produced around 1360, during the reign of Tsar Ivan Alexander, it is regarded as one of the masterpieces of the Tarnovo literary and art school of the time. It contains 109 valuable miniatures.

Discovered in 1901 in Macedonia by the Serbian research-worker and collector Simon Tomić, whose name it bears, it is exhibited in the State Historical Museum in Moscow, Russia.

See also

 Sofia Psalter, 1337
 Gospels of Tsar Ivan Alexander, 1355–1356

References
 

 Axinia Dzurova,  Tomic Psalter. Monumenta slavico-byzantina et mediaevalia europensia Vol I , Kliment Ohridski University Press, Sofia, 1990. Facsimile edition in two volumes.

Medieval Bulgarian literature
Medieval Bulgarian literature of Macedonia
1360 works
Christianity in Bulgaria
Illuminated psalters
Bulgarian art
Church Slavonic manuscripts